Ruchira Jadhav is an Indian television and film actress who mainly works in Marathi industry. She made her film debut with Sobat (2018) and Television debut with Tuzya Vachun Karmena (2016). Currently, she has participated in Colors Marathi's Bigg Boss Marathi 4.

Early life 
Ruchira was born in Dadar, Maharashtra. She did her schooling from Parag Vidyalaya, Bhandup. She completed her graduation degree from K. J. Somaiya College, Mumbai. She was very active in her college cultural programs.

Personal life 
She is in relationship with her fellow contestant of Bigg Boss Marathi 4 Rohit Shinde since 2022.

Filmography

Films

Television

References

External links
 

1989 births
Living people
21st-century Indian actresses
Actresses from Mumbai
Actresses in Marathi cinema
Indian web series actresses
Actresses in Marathi television
Indian soap opera actresses
Bigg Boss Marathi contestants